Ye Myint was the chief minister of Mandalay Region, Myanmar, from 2011 to 2016. He is a former lieutenant general in the Myanmar Army and former chief of Military Affairs Security.

A member of the Union Solidarity and Development Party, he was elected to represent Pyinoolwin Township Constituency No. 2 as a Mandalay Region Hluttaw representative in the 2010 Burmese general election.

Terrorist attack and fire 
In January 2014, a convoy carrying Ye Myint and two other regional ministers was hit by a landmine attack, at Naungcho, on the Mogok-Pyinoolwin highway, on the way back to Mandalay. On 19 April 2014, Ye Myint's Mandalay home caught fire, caused by an overheated surge protector connected to an air conditioning unit. On 22 April 2014, he was charged under Article 285 of the Myanmar Penal Code for negligence in a fire.

References

Government ministers of Myanmar
Union Solidarity and Development Party politicians
Living people
1943 births
Burmese military personnel